Suarez is a common Spanish surname. Suarez may also refer to:

Locations
Diego-Suarez, former name of Antsiranana, a city in Madagascar
Diego-Suarez Bay, former name of Antsiranana Bay
Archdiocese of Diego-Suarez, former name of Roman Catholic Archdiocese of Antsiranana
Postage stamps of Diego-Suárez
Coronel Suárez, a town in the south of the province of Buenos Aires, Argentina
Coronel Suárez Partido, subdivision of the province of Buenos Aires, Argentina
El Porvenir de Velasco Suarez, Chiapas, Mexico
Estadio Jorge Calero Suárez, multi-use stadium in El Salvador
González Suárez, electoral parish in Quito, Ecuador
Isla Suárez, island disputed by Brazil and Bolivia
Laguna Suárez, lake in Bolivia
Liceo Joaquin Suarez (Montevideo), school in Montevideo, Uruguay
Metro Pino Suárez, metro station in Mexico City
Nicolás Suárez Province, in Bolivia
Puerto Suárez, inland river port in Bolivia
Puerto Suárez International Airport
Residencia de Suarez, official residence of the President of Uruguay
Suarez, Colombia (disambiguation)
Suarez, Cauca, a municipality in the Cauca Department of Colombia
Suárez, Tolima, a municipality in the Tolima Department of Colombia
Suarez, Iligan City, Philippines
Tenosique de Pino Suárez, town in Tabasco, Mexico
Tristán Suárez, town in Buenos Aires Province, Argentina
Club Social y Deportivo Tristán Suárez, football club

Music
Suarez (band), Belgian band with Italo-Spanish origins
Suárez (band), Argentine indie rock band

Other uses
6438 Suárez, a main-belt asteroid
Duke of Suárez, Spanish title of nobility
V. Suarez & Co., Puerto Rican consumer products distributor